Streptomyces thermolineatus is a bacterium species from the genus of Streptomyces which has been isolated from sewage compost in Washington, D.C. in the United States.

See also 
 List of Streptomyces species

References

Further reading

External links
Type strain of Streptomyces thermolineatus at BacDive -  the Bacterial Diversity Metadatabase	

thermolineatus
Bacteria described in 1988